Kungia is a genus of Crassulaceae that contains 2 accepted species. It is a perennial herb growing in China (Gansu, Shaanxi, Sichuan).

Species
Kungia aliciae (Raym.-Hamet) K.T. Fu
Kungia schoenlandii (Raym.-Hamet) K.T. Fu

References

Crassulaceae
Crassulaceae genera